Phyllocnistis liriodendronella is a moth of the family Gracillariidae, known from the United States (New York, New Jersey, Maryland, Pennsylvania, Kentucky). The hostplants for the species include Liriodendron tulipifera, Magnolia grandiflora, and Magnolia virginiana. They mine the leaves of their host plant.

References

Bug Guide

Phyllocnistis
Endemic fauna of the United States